Robert Malval (born July 11, 1943 in Port-au-Prince) is the former prime minister of Haiti, his tenure was from August 30, 1993 to November 8, 1994.

An industrialist and business leader of Lebanese descent, Malval was appointed on August 16, 1993 by the President-in-exile, Jean-Bertrand Aristide, who gave Malval the task of reconciling the feuding parties. He defied the Army-backed president, Émile Jonassaint. In December 1993, he resigned his post and criticized Aristide as an "erratic" figure who was hampering efforts to solve the political crisis.

His predecessor was Marc Bazin; his successor was Smarck Michel.

References
Notes

Bibliography

 
 

1943 births
Living people
20th-century Haitian businesspeople
Haitian people of Lebanese descent
Prime Ministers of Haiti
People from Port-au-Prince
University of Miami alumni